Linda bei Weida is a German municipality in the Thuringian district of Greiz. It belongs to the Verwaltungsgemeinschaft of Wünschendorf/Elster. Linda is part of the Roman Catholic Diocese of Dresden-Meissen.

Geography

The municipality consists of the villages Linda and Pohlen.

Communities near Linda are Berga (Elster), Braunichswalde, Endschütz, Gauern, Hilbersdorf, and Rückersdorf in the Landkreis  of Greiz; as well as the free city of Gera.

References

Greiz (district)